Saïd Admane is an Algerian wrestler. He competed in the 1980 Summer Olympics.

References

External links
 

Living people
Wrestlers at the 1980 Summer Olympics
Algerian male sport wrestlers
Olympic wrestlers of Algeria
Year of birth missing (living people)
21st-century Algerian people